Umina Beach is a suburb within the  local government area on the Central Coast of New South Wales, Australia.

Umina Beach is locally known on the Central Coast as being on 'The Peninsula' (or 'Woy Woy Peninsula'). A natural peninsula that includes the towns of Umina Beach, Woy Woy, Blackwall, Booker Bay and Ettalong Beach. The main street, West Street, is the retail centre of The Peninsula with key national brands represented through Coles, Woolworths, Aldi and Bunnings.

Moving from north to south, Umina Beach begins where Woy Woy and Blackwall end: at Veron Road and Gallipoli Avenue.

Umina Beach is the most populated suburb on the Central Coast.

Geography
Umina Beach has one unbroken sand shoreline that has been divided in name only: Umina Beach (south western section) and Ocean Beach (north eastern section). Both beaches have their own Surf Life Saving Club (refer to Sports Clubs section). The only other type of shoreline is located at Umina Point (Mt Ettalong), a Hawkesbury Sandstone headland that adjoins the south western end of Umina Beach.

Umina Beach is geographically located on the north side of Broken Bay at the river mouth of Hawkesbury River. The formation of Umina Beach and 'The Peninsula' is due to sand deposition that has been influenced by (and not limited to) climatic conditions, soil-binding flora, Hawkesbury Sandstone formations (e.g.; Box Head, Barrenjoey and Umina Point), wave patterns and tidal amplitude from the Tasman Sea, Hawkesbury River and Brisbane Water.

History
The word "Umina" was derived from the Australian Aboriginal word meaning Place of sleep.

The Woy Woy and Umina district was home to the Guringai Australian Aboriginal tribe. This tribe stretched from the north side of Port Jackson, north through Pittwater, Broken Bay and Brisbane Water, to the southern end of Lake Macquarie.

European entry to the region was first recorded in March 1788 when Governor Arthur Phillip landed with a party at Ettalong Beach.
In June 1789, a more thorough investigation of Brisbane Water was conducted. A rest stop was made at Ettalong Beach before the group passed through 'The Rip' (a dangerous passage leading into Brisbane Water). On return, the party camped at Ettalong Beach before sailing to Dangar Island in the Hawkesbury River.

The first land subdivision occurred in 1914 which led to the current commercial and residential centre. Umina Beach celebrated its 100th anniversary in 2014.

Schools
Umina Beach is served by two public schools, Umina Public School (primary school) and Brisbane Water Secondary College(high school).

Opened on 3 February 1956, Umina Public School's population approximates 800 students and 50 staff. It currently has 29 classes from kindergarten to year 6.

Business

Umina Beach town centre has been represented by the Peninsula Chamber of Commerce since the late 1980s. It is affiliated with the NSW Business Chamber. The town centre is serviced by Woolworths, Coles, Bunnings Hardware, Aldi Supermarkets and McDonald's, along with a number of local shops, takeaway restaurants and cafes, including the multi-award-winning Bremen Patisserie on West street. The town is also serviced by a number of medical and specialist practices, the Central Coast Council Library, and two service stations.

Transport Links

Umina Beach is well serviced by regular bus services (Busways) with connections to Woy Woy Rail Station and Gosford. The town centre is easily accessed with an efficient grid system of connecting roads with primary access from Ocean Beach Road, West Street and Barrenjoey Road.
Substantial car parking facilities adjacent to the town centre contribute to its success as a retail hub.

Media
Community Papers:

 Peninsula Community Access News, fortnightly free distribution within the 2256 and 2257 postcode areas.
 Central Coast Express Advocate, published by News Limited's Cumberland Courier Newspapers, is distributed free every Wednesday & Friday.
 Central Coast Sun Weekly was last published on 30 April 2009.

Radio Broadcasting:

Umina Beach is locally serviced by the national public broadcaster, Australian Broadcasting Corporation, via ABC Local Radio 2BL/T 92.5 FM.

Commercial licences covering Umina Beach are:

Analogue FM and AM signals can be received from Sydney and Newcastle. As a result, Umina Beach is located within the most saturated radio market in Australia.

As of August 2010, there was no launch date known for Digital Radio services for the Central Coast.

Sports fields
Umina Oval, located at the southern end of Melbourne Avenue, is the home ground for four pitch team sports: Soccer, Rugby league, Cricket and Tennis.

McEvoy Oval, located at the western end of McEvoy Avenue, is used for Track and Field Athletics, Touch Football and Cricket.

Sports clubs
Club Umina RSL Bowls Club is located in Melbourne Avenue, Umina Beach, within the Club Umina complex. Membership is available to ex and existing Servicemen of the Australian Defence Force and its allies who are financial members of both Club Umina and either Full or Associate Members of Merrylands RSL Club Sub-Branch.
Ocean Beach Malibu Club.
Ocean Beach Surf Life Saving Club is located at the southern end of Trafalgar Avenue, Umina Beach.
Ocean Beach Surfers Association.
 Umina Beach "Bunnies" Rugby League Football Club is based at Umina Oval and play on the Col Gooley Field. The club is affiliated with the Central Coast Division of Country Rugby League (refer also to Country Rugby League) within the New South Wales Rugby League. The Bunnies team sheet has included Australian Kangaroos experience: Mark Geyer in 1993 and Cliff Lyons as Captain-Coach in 2001.
Umina Boardriders.
Umina "Bunnies" Junior Rugby League Football Club is based at Umina Oval and play on the Col Gooley Field. The club is affiliated with the Central Coast Division Junior Rugby League which is part of the Central Coast Division of Country Rugby League (refer also to Country Rugby League) within the New South Wales Rugby League.
Umina Beach "Bunnies" Netball Club are emotionally linked to Umina Junior Rugby League Football Club and do not have a physical presence in Umina Beach. The club conducts committee meetings at Woy Woy Leagues Club, Blackwall Road, Woy Woy, has a postal address in Ettalong Beach and plays in the Woy Woy Peninsula Netball Associations competition, located in Lagoon Street, Ettalong Beach.
Umina Beach Surf Life Saving Club is located at the southern end of Ocean Beach Road, Umina Beach.
Umina "Devils" Cricket Club is based at Umina Oval and has 2 cricket fields. The main cricket field, Field 1, is located on the eastern side of the oval, on Col Gooley Field, and has multiple grass pitches. Field 2 is located on the western side of the oval and has one artificial cricket pitch. The club caters for both senior and junior players from 5 years of age.
The Umina cup is an annual father's vs sons soccer game at Umina beach holiday park. This game has been played 4 times and has been won by the sons all 4 times. The most famous ground is sand field as there has been 3 of the 4 games played their.
Umina United "Eagles" Soccer Club is based at Umina Oval. The club caters for both senior and junior players from 5 years of age. The club is affiliated with Central Coast Football.
Woy Woy Peninsula Little Athletics Centre is based at McEvoy Oval.  The club is affiliated with Central Coast Little Athletics. The club caters for junior athletes from 6 years of age.

Umina Beach is known as the home of "Upball"

Community Groups
Umina Community Group The Umina Community Group is committed to improving Umina Beach by providing a unified voice to lobby the Central Coast Council and government bodies. Umina Beach is a growing community, along with its many visitors, this means improvements to local infrastructure and services in Umina Beach and Ocean Beach are essential to allow Umina Beach to thrive as a modern coastal community.
Umina Beach Men's Shed The Men's Shed. This is a place where members of the community of all different life experiences come together at their own pace, share skills, swap ideas, solve problems and be involved in projects for the benefit of the community.

Notable residents
 Belinda Emmett (1974–2006), actress and singer, grew up in Umina Beach.
 Eric Worrell MBE (1924–1987), zoologist and writer.
 Dane Searls, (1988-2011) BMX rider.
 James Harrison (blood donor), OAM Anti-D Vaccine blood donor.

References

Suburbs of the Central Coast (New South Wales)